is a Japanese voice actress and singer. She is affiliated with the talent agency Music Ray'n. After passing an audition held by Music Ray'n, she made her voice acting debut in 2012. She played her first main role as Kaori Fujimiya in the 2014 anime television series One Week Friends.

Some of her anime roles include Elizabeth Liones in The Seven Deadly Sins, Aqua in KonoSuba, Akame in Akame ga Kill!, Touka Kirishima in Tokyo Ghoul, Asseylum Vers Allusia in Aldnoah.Zero, Chizuru Mizuhara in Rent-A-Girlfriend, Isla in Plastic Memories, Mayuri in Date A Live: The Movie – Mayuri Judgement, Miia in Monster Musume, Hitomi Uzaki in Killing Bites, Ayame Himuro in Science Fell in Love, So I Tried to Prove It, and Nazuna Nanakusa in Call of the Night. She also performed theme songs for various anime she has acted in. In 2015, she received the Best Rookie Actress Award at the 9th Seiyu Awards.

Amamiya is a member of the music unit TrySail, along with voice actresses Momo Asakura and Shiina Natsukawa. She is also active as a solo singer, having released three albums, two compilation albums, and one cover album as of 2022. Her music career has been influenced by various inspirations, including among others CD covers and foreign styles of music.

Biography

Early life
Amamiya was born in Tokyo, Japan on August 28, 1993. While a sophomore in high school, she was introduced to a video collection of roles of voice actress Miyuki Sawashiro. Following this, Amamiya decided to become a voice actress.

Acting career
Amamiya, together with Momo Asakura and Shiina Natsukawa, passed an audition held by Music Ray'n in 2011, with the three making their voice acting debut in 2012. Her first lead role was Kaori Fujimiya in the 2014 anime television series One Week Friends. That same year, she played the role of Akame in Akame ga Kill!, Asseylum Vers Allusia in Aldnoah.Zero, Touka Kirishima in Tokyo Ghoul, and Elizabeth Liones in The Seven Deadly Sins.

In 2015, she was cast as Isla in Plastic Memories, Miia in Monster Musume, and Mayuri in the anime film Date A Live: The Movie – Mayuri Judgement. Amamiya, together with Reina Ueda and Aya Suzaki, received the Best Rookie Actress Award at the 9th Seiyu Awards in March 2015. That same year, she played the role of Aqua in the anime KonoSuba.

In 2017, she played the role of Rui Kanoya in Re:Creators, and Haruka Narumi in Battle Girl High School. The following year, she was cast as Methode in Beatless, Hitomi Uzaki in Killing Bites, and Dancho Arthur in the mobile game Han-Gyaku-Sei Million Arthur; she would later reprise the role in the game's anime adaptation. She played the role of Akemi Sōryūin in the anime How Heavy Are the Dumbbells You Lift?, and reprised her role as Aqua in the anime film KonoSuba: God's Blessing on This Wonderful World! Legend of Crimson in 2019.

In 2020, she played Chizuru Mizuhara in the anime series Rent-A-Girlfriend. In 2021, she voiced Miko Yotsuya in the anime series Mieruko-chan.

Music career
Amamiya's music career began when she performed the song , a cover of a 2004 single by Sukima Switch. The song was used as the ending theme to One Week Friends. She made her official music debut for Music Ray'n by performing Akame ga Kills opening theme song "Skyreach"; the song peaked at number 13 on the Oricon weekly charts.

In late 2014, Amamiya, Asakura, and Natsukawa formed the music unit TrySail, which released its first single "Youthful Dreamer", used as the opening theme song to the anime television series Ultimate Otaku Teacher, on May 13, 2015. In 2016, she, along with her co-stars, Rie Takahashi and Ai Kayano performed KonoSubas ending theme song . She released her first solo album Various BLUE on September 7, 2016; the album peaked at number 7 on the Oricon weekly charts. Her second album The Only BLUE was released on July 11, 2018.

In 2020, she performed the song , which was used as an insert song in the twelfth episode of Rent-A-Girlfriend. She released her third album Paint It, BLUE on September 2, 2020. She released a cover album titled Covers: Sora Amamiya Favorite Songs on October 21, 2021, and two compilation albums titled Red and Blue on January 5, 2022.

Musical style and influences
In an interview with the anime publication LisAni, Amamiya described the production process of her single "Freesia", the title track of which was used as the ending theme to the Japanese airing of the animated television series Heaven Official's Blessing. She noted that, starting in 2017, she tended to release solo singles in odd-numbered years, and how "Freesia" fit that pattern as well. She noted that "Freesia" has an oriental atmosphere, with the first part having the image of a small room that opens up as a result of becoming rusty; the song's oriental atmosphere also influenced its music video. The appearance of the single's title on the cover, as well as the cover itself, were meant to be reminiscent of a retro 7-inch single, with her emphasizing this point by holding a vintage microphone. For the single's B-side "Jōnetsu no Te Amo", she aimed for the song to have a Latin flavor, with the song featuring a Spanish guitar among other influences. She noted that writing the song was a challenge as she did not play the guitar and she had to research various kinds of instruments. The single's third song "Emerald" was also noted to have an exotic introduction.

Filmography

Anime

Films

Video games

Live-action

Dubbing

Discography

Albums

Singles

References

External links
  
  
  
 
  at Oricon 

1993 births
Living people
Anime singers
Japanese video game actresses
Japanese voice actresses
Japanese women pop singers
Japanese YouTubers
Seiyu Award winners
Singers from Tokyo
Voice actresses from Tokyo
21st-century Japanese actresses
21st-century Japanese singers
21st-century Japanese women singers